Eleonora Vandi (born 15 March 1996) is an Italian middle-distance runner competing primarily in the 800 metres.

Eleonora is the older sister of the sprinter Elisabetta Vandi.

Biography
She represented her country at the 2019 World Championships without advancing from the first round. Both her parents were athletes, father Luca a middle-distance runner, mother Valeria Fontan a sprinter.

Achievements

National titles
Italian Athletics Championships
1500 m: 2020

Personal bests
Outdoor
800 metres – 2:00.88 (Rehlingen 2019)
1500 metres – 4:18.07 (Pescara 2018)
3000 metres – 9:36.81 (Trento 2018)
Indoor
800 metres – 2:05.62 (Ancona 2019)
1500 metres – 4:21.74 (Padua 2019)
3000 metres – 9:50.31 (Padua 2019)

References

External links
 

1996 births
Living people
Italian female middle-distance runners
World Athletics Championships athletes for Italy
People from Pesaro
Competitors at the 2019 Summer Universiade
Italian Athletics Championships winners
Sportspeople from the Province of Pesaro and Urbino